"" (Where should I flee) is a hymn in seven stanzas by the German Baroque poet, Lutheran minister and hymn-writer Johann Heermann. It was first published in 1630 during the Thirty Years' War. It is a penitential hymn for Lent.

History 
Heermann, the hymn's poet, was influenced by the tract  (Book of the German poetry) by Martin Opitz's, published in 1624, which defended German poetry and set guidelines on how German poetry should be composed.

Heermann lived in Köben, Silesia, when he wrote the hymn, an area which suffered under the war. The town was plundered four times. Several times, he lost his possessions and had to flee for his life. Nonetheless, in 1630 in Breslau (now Wrocław, Poland), Silesia, he published a volume of hymns, Devoti musica cordis, Hauss-und Herz-Musica (Latin, German: "music for a devout heart, house and heart music"), including "". The volume also contained the Passion hymn "". These hymns have been described as "the first in which the correct and elegant versification of Opitz was applied to religious subjects, ... distinguished by great depth and tenderness of feeling, by an intense love of the Saviour, and earnest but not self-conscious humility".

 is in twelve stanzas of 6 lines each.

Melody and settings  
"Wo soll ich fliehen hin" is sung to the hymn tune of "Auf meinen lieben Gott", Zahn No. 2164.

Johann Sebastian composed the chorale cantata Wo soll ich fliehen hin, BWV 5, based on the hymn. He used the tune in a chorale fantasia in the opening movement, as an oboe line in an alto recitative, and in a four-part setting as the closing chorale.

References

External links 
 Chorale Melodies used in Bach's Vocal Works / Wo soll ich fliehen hin / Auf meinen lieben Gott Bach Cantatas Website

17th-century hymns in German
Lutheran hymns